Sharat Saxena (born 17 August 1950) is an Indian actor who appears in Hindi films along with Telugu, Malayalam and Tamil films. He has acted in more than 250 Bollywood films.
Saxena started his career in the early 1970s and has mainly played supporting roles.

He has starred in some of the most successful films of Hindi cinema like Mr. India, Tridev, Ghayal, Khiladi, Ghulam, Gupt: The Hidden Truth, Duplicate, Soldier, Baghban, Fanaa, Krrish, Ek Hi Raasta (1993), Bajrangi Bhaijan and many more. His performances in these films have established him as one of the best supporting actors in Bollywood.

He played the role of Kichaka in the television serial Mahabharat. He is well known for his role of Daaga in the Hindi movie, Mr. India and Totla Seth in the popular comedy movie Phir Hera Pheri . He was also nominated for Filmfare Best Villain Award for Ghulam (1998).

Early life

Sharat Saxena was born on 17 August 1950 in Satna, Madhya Pradesh. He spent most of his childhood in Bhopal. He is married to Shobha Saxena. He did his schooling from St. Joseph's Convent School, Bhopal, and Christ Church Boys' Senior Secondary School, Jabalpur. After doing Engineering in Electronics & Telecommunication from Jabalpur Engineering College, he wanted to become an actor. So, in 1972, he came to Mumbai. The going was tough because of his build, but eventually, he got the role of a henchman. Benaam was his first release. Then followed Dil Dewana, Agent Vinod, Kaala Patthar and others.

Personal life
He currently lives in Madh Island, a colony on the outskirts of Mumbai. He lives with his wife, Shobha, and two children, Veera and Vishal.

Filmography

Hindi films

Benaam (1974)
Jaaneman (1976)
Agent Vinod (1977)
Des Pardes (1978)
Kaala Patthar (1979)
Tarana (1979)
Lootmaar (1980)
Shaan (1980)
Shakti (1982)
Pukar (1983)
Aasmaan (1984) as Major
Boxer (1984) as Raghuraj
Kanoon Kya Karega (1984)
Zamana (1985)
Aitbaar (1985)
Saagar (1985)
Bepanaah (1985) as Ujagar Singh
Maa Kasam (1985) as Makhan Singh
Mera Dharam (1986) 
Manav Hatya (1986) as Inspector Joseph 
Tan-Badan (1986)
Karma (1986)
Inaam Dus Hazaar (1987)
Mr. India (1987)
Deewana Tere Naam Ka (1987)
Hifazat (1987) as Shambhu Dada
Khatron Ke Khiladi (1988) as Inspector Amarnath / Daku Jwala Singh
Shahenshah (1988) 
Meri Zabaan (1989)
Rakhwala (1989)
Daana Paani (1989 film)
Tridev (1989) as Inspector Suraj
Dost (1989)
Agneepath (1990)
Ghayal (1990) as Deeka
Thanedaar (1990)
Jurm (1990)
Mast Kalandar (1991) 
Narsimha (1991)
Banjaran(1991)
 Parakrami (1991) (Unreleased) 
Rishta To Ho Aisa (1992)
Vishwatma (1992)
Khiladi (1992) as Bahadur Singh
Zulm Ki Hukumat (1992) as Reddy
Aashik Awara (1993) as Kargah
 Ek Hi Raasta (1993)
 Lootere (1993)
 Beta Ho To Aisa (1994)
 Policewala Gunda (1995)
Gupt: The Hidden Truth (1997)
 Ziddi (1997)
Duplicate (1998)
Ghulam (1998) as Raunak Singh
Soldier (1998) as Baldev Sinha
 Safari (1999 film) 
Baadshah (1999) as Moti
Paanch (Unreleased)
Phir Bhi Dil Hai Hindustani (2000)Josh (2000)Aaghaaz (2000)Ajnabee (2001)Maa Tujhhe Salaam (2002)Tumko Na Bhool Paayenge (2002)Rishtey (2002)Saathiya (2002)Baghban (2003)2 October (2003)Haasil (2003)Asambhav (2004)Tumsa Nahin Dekha (2004 film)(2004)Vaah! Life Ho Toh Aisi! (2005)Viruddh (2005)Mumbai Xpress (2005)Phir Hera Pheri (2006)Bhagam Bhag (2006)Baabul (2006)Fanaa (2006)Krrish (2006)Pyaar Ke Side Effects (2006)Hello (2008)De Dana Dan (2009)Vaada Raha... I Promise (2009) Kushti (2010)Ready (2011)Bodyguard (2011)Bumboo (2012)Deewana Main Deewana (2013)John Day (2013)Club 60 (2013)Bullett Raja (2013)Hasee Toh Phasee (2014)Singham Returns (2014)Bajrangi Bhaijaan (2015)Kis Kisko Pyaar Karoon (2015)Pyaar Ka Punchnama 2 (2015)Thugs Of Hindostan (2018)Race 3 (2018) as RaghuDassehra (2018)Dabangg 3 (2019) as SP SatyendraHansa Ek Sanyog (2019)Jai Mummy Di (2020)Sherni (2021)
Tadap (2021)
Hume Toh Loot Liya (2023)....MX Player film

Malayalam films
Jeevante Jeevan (1985)
Aryan (1988)
Kilukkam (1991) as Samar Khan
Agni Nilavu (1991)
Thenmavin Kombath (1994)
Nirnayam (1995) as Ifti
Thakshashila (1995)
C. I. D. Moosa (2003) as Khalid Mohammad Baba
Kilukkam Kilukilukkam (2006) as Samar Khan
Sringaravelan (2013) as Ahuja
Gold (2022) as Major Colonel Singhania (Cameo)

Punjabi films
Ucha Dar Babey Nanak Da (1982)

Telugu films
Ashoka Chakravarthy (1989)
Nirnayam (1991)
Gharana Mogudu (1992)
Mutha Mestri (1993)
Money (1993)
Bangaru Bullodu (1993)
Gandeevam (1994)
S. P. Parasuram (1994)
Mugguru Monagallu (1994)
Money Money (1995)
Raja Simham (1995)
Ugadi (1997)
Okkadu Chaalu (2000)
Simhadri (2003)
Bunny (2005)

Tamil films
Gunaa (1991) 
Mannan (1992)
Sudhandhiram (2000)
Narasimha (2001) 
Mumbai Xpress (2005)
Si3 (2017)
Vivegam (2017)

TV series
Mahabharat – Kichaka
Kanoon – Avinash/Inspector Sooraj Singh
Main Dilli Hoon – Shukracharya
Sajan Re Phir Jhoot Mat Bolo – Kulguru Trikaldarshi

Awards and nominations
1998: Nominated :Filmfare Best Villain Award for Ghulam

References

External links

Early life
interview
biography

Indian male film actors
Living people
1950 births
Male actors in Malayalam cinema
Male actors in Tamil cinema
Male actors in Telugu cinema
Male actors in Kannada cinema
People from Satna
Male actors from Madhya Pradesh
Indian male television actors
Male actors in Hindi television
20th-century Indian male actors
21st-century Indian male actors
Male actors in Punjabi cinema
Male actors in Hindi cinema
People from Satna district